Unione Sportiva Sassuolo Calcio, or simply Sassuolo, is an Italian women football club based in Sassuolo.

History 
The club was known as A.S.D. Reggiana Calcio Femminile, but plays under U.S. Sassuolo Calcio's crest and name due to sponsorship and licensing reason in 2016. A formal name change to A.S.D. Sassuolo Calcio Femminile was completed in 2017. In 2019, the "sport title" of "A.S.D. Sassuolo Calcio Femminile" was formally transferred to U.S. Sassuolo Calcio the male professional club.

Colours
Sassuolo Femminile use black and green as the colors of their first team home kit. From 2016 to 2019, it used azure.

Players

Current squad

Notable players

See also 
 List of women's association football clubs
 List of women's football clubs in Italy

References

External links
 

Women's football clubs in Italy
Football clubs in Emilia-Romagna
Association football clubs established in 2016
2016 establishments in Italy
U.S. Sassuolo Calcio
Organisations based in Reggio Emilia
Serie A (women's football) clubs